SRL Diagnostics is a diagnostics company based in India providing diagnostic services in pathology and radiology. SRL Diagnostics has its headquarters and corporate office in Gurgaon.

History
SRL was founded in 1995 by brothers Shivinder Mohan Singh and Malvinder Mohan Singh as SRL Ranbaxy, a division of Ranbaxy Laboratories. It became the first pathology company in India to receive accreditation from National Accreditation Board.

In 2008, SRL Ranbaxy was renamed as Super Religare Laboratories.

In 2010, SRL acquired Piramal Diagnostic Services and its network of 107 laboratories from Piramal Healthcare for 600 crore.

In 2011, Fortis Healthcare completed the acquisition of 74.59% stake in SRL. After being acquired by Fortis, the company rebranded itself as SRL Diagnostics.

In 2021, SRL acquired the remaining stake in its Kerala-based joint venture, DDRC, for 350 crore. With the addition of DDRC's 220 labs to its lab network, SRL became the biggest pathology lab chain in India with a total of 430 labs.

Operations

SRL has two reference labs one in Goregaon (Mumbai), and one in Gurgaon (Haryana), India. The company has more than 418 networking laboratories, including four "Centers of Excellence", 26 radiology/imaging centers, 40 NABL accredited, and four CAP-accredited labs and a footprint spanning over 9000 collection points in India. Along with this, the company also has large labs in Dubai, Sri Lanka and Nepal, and about 70 different collection points in various countries outside India.

SRL Diagnostics claims to offer more than 3,500 different tests in pathology, radiology, wellness, occupational health and clinical trials and also carries out more than 107,000 tests in a day. SRL Diagnostics operates diagnostic centres, collection centres, and laboratories. SRL Diagnostics also offers tests in pathology covering biochemistry, immunology, herpetology, clinical pathology, histopathology and immunohistochemistry, microbiology, molecular biology, cytogenetics, and flow cytometry.

References 

Health care companies of India
Laboratories in India
Indian companies established in 1995
1995 establishments in Haryana
Companies based in Gurgaon